The Ypapantis Monastery, also known as the Monastery of the Ascension of the Savior, is a former Eastern Orthodox Christian monastery that is part of the Meteora monastery complex in Thessaly, central Greece. The monastery is built into the side of Dimitrios Rock.

Description
Today, Ypapantis Monastery (literally "Monastery of the Purification [of the Virgin Mary]") is inactive and rarely visited, although the building has been restored.

Access
A stairway leads up to the monastery building from the main road, which is unpaved. A network of trails connects it with Dupiani Rock and the village of Kastraki.

References

Meteora